In mathematics, gap theorem may refer to:

 The Weierstrass gap theorem in algebraic geometry
 The Ostrowski–Hadamard gap theorem on lacunary function
 The Fabry gap theorem on lacunary functions
 The gap theorem of Fourier analysis, a statement about the vanishing of discrete Fourier coefficients for functions that are identically zero on an interval shorter than 2π
 The gap theorem in computational complexity theory
 Saharon Shelah's Main Gap Theorem which solved Morley's problem in model theory